Tricornis is a genus of sea snails, marine gastropod mollusks in the family Strombidae, the true conchs.

Species
Species within the genus Tricornis include:
Tricornis oldi (Emerson, 1965)
Tricornis tricornis (Lightfoot, 1786)

Species brought into synonymy
Tricornis raninus (Gmelin, 1791) is a synonym of Lobatus raninus (Gmelin, 1791)

References

External links

Strombidae